Ngio is a village and tambon (subdistrict) of Thoeng District, in Chiang Rai Province, Thailand. In 2005 it had a population of 12,589 people. The  tambon 1 contains 25 villages.

References

Tambon of Chiang Rai province
Populated places in Chiang Rai province